Rasmus Poulsen Guldhammer (born 9 March 1989 in Vejle) is a Danish former professional cyclist.

Major results

2006
 3rd Time trial, National Junior Road Championships
2007
 1st  Road race, National Junior Road Championships
 7th Overall Trofeo Karlsberg
2008
 5th Overall Giro delle Regioni
 8th Fyen Rundt
2009
 1st  Road race, National Under-23 Road Championships
 1st Liège–Bastogne–Liège Espoirs
 2nd Ronde van Vlaanderen U23
 3rd Overall Grand Prix du Portugal
1st Stages 1 & 2
 4th Overall Danmark Rundt
1st  Young rider classification
 4th La Côte Picarde
2010
 2nd Fyen Rundt
 6th Overall Danmark Rundt
1st  Young rider classification
 7th GP Herning
2011
 1st Stage 2b Le Triptyque des Monts et Châteaux
 2nd Himmerland Rundt
2013
 3rd Overall Rás Tailteann
 4th GP Herning
 5th Ringerike GP
 6th Himmerland Rundt
2014
 1st Hadeland GP
 2nd Himmerland Rundt
 3rd Skive–Løbet
 4th Overall Tour du Loir-et-Cher
1st Stages 4 & 5
 7th Giro di Toscana
 9th Destination Thy
2015
 2nd GP Horsens
 4th Overall Tour des Fjords
 4th Overall Danmark Rundt
 4th Overall Tour of Britain
 4th Gran Premio di Lugano
 5th Classica Corsica
 5th Volta Limburg Classic
 7th Overall Arctic Race of Norway
 8th Trofeo Laigueglia
 9th GP Ouest–France
 10th Vattenfall Cyclassics
2016
 2nd Velothon Wales
 4th GP Horsens
 8th Grand Prix de Wallonie
2017
 1st Sundvolden GP
 1st Ringerike GP
 2nd GP Horsens
 3rd Overall Tour du Loir-et-Cher
 3rd Overall Kreiz Breizh Elites
1st Stage 4
 3rd GP Viborg
 4th Overall Danmark Rundt
 5th Overall Istrian Spring Trophy
 6th Overall Circuit des Ardennes
1st Stage 2
 6th Overall Czech Cycling Tour
 10th Overall Tour de Luxembourg
2019
 5th Volta Limburg Classic
 5th Gylne Gutuer

References

External links

1989 births
Living people
Danish male cyclists
People from Vejle Municipality
Sportspeople from the Region of Southern Denmark